Castleford High School is a high school in Castleford, Idaho.

School history
Castleford High School was founded in 1947. Citizens passed a bond in 1949 to construct the high school building and a supplemental bond in 1951 to complete construction. Formal dedication of the original high school, located on Main Street, occurred in February 1952.

In 1960 the Board of Education consisted of George Blick, Art Reese, Minnie Kinyon, Clinton Quigely, B. P. Johnson and Howard Barns. Floyd E. Bowers was the high school principal and the faculty members were Mrs. Hesseholt, Mr. Waite, Mrs. Haley, Mr. Heidel, Mr. Jackson, Mr. Marrs, Mr. Williamson and Mr. Thomas.

References

Public high schools in Idaho
Educational institutions established in 1947
Schools in Twin Falls County, Idaho
1947 establishments in Idaho
School buildings completed in 1952